The Junon was a 32-gun Charmante class frigate of the French Navy

Career 

Junon took part in the Battle of Ushant under Admiral d'Orvilliers. She captured HMS Fox on 11 September 1778.

 

On 17 August 1779, under captain Charles de Bernard de Marigny and along with Gentille, she captured HMS Ardent. On 13 September, under lieutenant Kergariou Locmaria, she captured .

In October 1780, Junon sailed from Martinique to St. Vincent towing a schooner to deliver hospital supplies to the island, which had recently come under French control. Junon anchored beneath the cliffs in Kingstown Harbour and, due to a broken barometer, had no warning when the island was struck by a hurricane. The massive storm, known as the Great Hurricane of 1780, battered the frigate against the cliffs and caused her to sink on 11 October 1780, although her captain managed to lead the entire crew off the ship and up the cliffs in safety.

Archaeological investigations 

From December 1997 to January 1998 the Junon shipwreck was investigated by an archaeological team sponsored by the Institute of Maritime History and Florida State University and directed by David Johnson and Chuck Meide. The site was initially thought to be that of the British slave ship  Africa , but after raising a cannon and finding it to be a French naval gun dated 1776, it was realized the ship was likely a late 18th-century French frigate. Confirmation that the wreck was that of the  Junon  came over twenty years later after the discovery of archival documents in France by archaeologist Jean-Sébastien Guibert of the University of the French Antilles. Guibert led a second archaeological expedition to the wreck of Junon in October 2021. The 2021 expedition consisted of a French team along with American archaeologist Chuck Meide from the original 1997-1998 investigation. Guibert plans to return to the site of the  Junon  to conduct additional excavation in 2023.

References

External links 

  Les bâtiments ayant porté le nom de Junon, Netmarine.net

Age of Sail frigates of France
Ships built in France
1778 ships
Charmante-class frigates
Maritime incidents in 1780
Shipwrecks in the Caribbean Sea